Vázquez is a Cuban village and consejo popular ("people's council", i.e. hamlet) of the municipality of Puerto Padre, in Las Tunas Province. In 2011 it had a population of around 13,600.

History
The village was founded in 1884, and was named after two brothers who build the first finca.

Geography
Located on a plain between Puerto Padre (17 km east); Manatí (43 km northwest) and Las Tunas (32 km southwest), Vázquez is s rural town surrounded by the villages of Yarey de Vázquez, Aguada de Vázquez and Gayol, with whom it forms a small urban area of about 20,000 inhabitants. It is 23 km from Delicias, 31 from Jesús Menéndez and 34 from Calixto.

Transport
The village is served by a railway station on Las Tunas-Puerto Padre line, is crossed in the middle by the highway 6-123 Las Tunas-Puerto Padre, and is 7 km south of the state highway "Circuito Norte" (CN).

Health 
The village has a general hospital named "Policlínico Docente 28 de Septiembre", opened in 1989.

See also
Municipalities of Cuba
List of cities in Cuba

References

External links

Populated places in Las Tunas Province
Puerto Padre
Populated places established in 1884